San Pablo, officially the Municipality of San Pablo (Subanen: Benwa San Pablo; Chavacano: Municipalidad de San Pablo), is a 4th class municipality in the province of Zamboanga del Sur, Philippines. According to the 2020 census, it has a population of 26,648 people.

Geography

Barangays
San Pablo is politically subdivided into 28 barangays.

Climate

Demographics

Economy

References

External links
 San Pablo Profile at PhilAtlas.com
 [ Philippine Standard Geographic Code]
Philippine Census Information

Municipalities of Zamboanga del Sur